Proud Theater is a theatre nonprofit for LGBTQ+ youth with companies in the Wisconsin cities of Green Bay, Madison, Milwaukee, Sun Prairie, and Wausau. Proud Theater was founded in Madison in 1999 by Sol Kelley-Jones and Callen Harty. Harty is notable in the Madison theater community as having been Artistic Director of Broom Street Theater from 2005-2010. Harty's long-time partner Brian Wild, also formerly of Broom Street Theater, has served as executive director since Proud Theater's formal independent organization in 2011. Proud Theater was a founding member of the Pride Youth Theater Alliance, a national network of queer youth theaters affiliated with The Theater Offensive.

References

External links
 Official site
 Art and Soul Innovations
 Pride Youth Theater Alliance

Non-profit organizations based in Wisconsin
Organizations based in Madison, Wisconsin